The Silver Palm Schoolhouse is an historic school in the Silver Palm Historic District within the unincorporated community of Redland, Florida, United States. It is located at Silver Palm Drive and Newton Road. On July 2, 1987, it was added to the U.S. National Register of Historic Places.

Built in 1904 by local residents, the two-story structure was the first and largest of seven rural schools that were built in the Redlands. It operated as a school until 1916, when it and the other six rural schools were consolidated into the Redland Farm Life School.

References

External links

 Dade County listings at National Register of Historic Places
 Florida's Office of Cultural and Historical Programs
 Dade County listings
 Silver Palm Schoolhouse

Buildings and structures in Miami-Dade County, Florida
National Register of Historic Places in Miami-Dade County, Florida
Schoolhouses in the United States